The Treason Act 1743 (17 Geo.II c.39) was an Act of the Parliament of Great Britain which made it high treason to correspond with any of the sons of James Francis Edward Stuart ("The Old Pretender"), who claimed to be king of Great Britain and of Ireland. His sons were Charles Edward Stuart ("The Young Pretender") and Henry Benedict Stuart (who, after his elder brother's death in 1788, never asserted a claim to the throne).

Provisions
Section 1 enacted that after 1 May 1744 it was treason for anyone to "hold, entertain, or keep any intelligence or correspondence in person, or by letters, messages or otherwise" with any son of the Old Pretender, or any of his employees, "knowing such person to be so employed," or to give them money, whether in Great Britain or elsewhere.

Section 2 provided that from the same date, any son of the Old Pretender who landed or attempted to land in Great Britain or Ireland, "or any of the dominions or territories belonging to the crown of Great Britain," or who was found there or in any ship with intent to land there, would be guilty of treason.

Section 3 amended section X of the Treason Act 1708. This section had originally provided that after the death of the Old Pretender, "no attainder for treason shall extend to the disinheriting of any heir, nor to the prejudice of the right or title of any person or persons, other than the right or title of the offender or offenders, during his, her, or their natural lives, only..." (See corruption of blood.) The 1743 Act postponed the operation of this clause until after the death of all of the Old Pretender's sons (which occurred in 1807), instead of his own death (in 1766). (The 1708 and 1743 Acts were amended in turn by the 1799 Act 39 Geo.3 c.93, which repealed these provisions.)

Section 4 stated that offences committed out of Great Britain could be tried anywhere in Great Britain.

Previous legislation
Four previous statutes had made similar provision in respect of the Old Pretender and his father, the late King James:

Correspondence with Enemies Act 1691
Correspondence with the Pretender Act 1697
Correspondence with James the Pretender (High Treason) Act 1701
Correspondence with Enemies Act 1704

See also
Jacobitism
High treason in the United Kingdom
Treason Act

References

 The statutes at large from the 15th to the 20th year of King George III [vol. XVIII]; Charles Bathurst, London. 1765.

Treason in the United Kingdom
Great Britain Acts of Parliament 1743
Repealed Great Britain Acts of Parliament